The Workers' Peasants' Party of Turkey (TİKP) is a Maoist scientific socialist political party in Turkey, which was founded on 18 June 2010 and led by İsmail Durna. The TİKP advocates national democratic revolution strategy.

See also

 List of political parties in Turkey

References

2010 establishments in Turkey
Anti-imperialist organizations
Communist parties in Turkey
Eurasianism
Left-wing nationalist parties
Maoist organizations in Turkey
Maoist parties
Political parties established in 2010